is a Japanese swimmer. She competed in the women's 200 metre butterfly event at the 2016 Summer Olympics. In April 2017, Hasegawa broke the world junior record in the 200 butterfly with a 2:02.96 at Japanese Nationals. She qualified to represent Japan at the 2020 Summer Olympics.

When she was 14 years old, Hasegawa competed at the 2014 Junior Pan Pacific Swimming Championships in Hawaii, United States, where she won the gold medal in the 100 metre butterfly with a time of 58.91 seconds, which was 0.23 seconds slower than the Championships record of 58.68 seconds set in 2012 by Noemie Thomas of Canada, as well as a silver medal in the 4×100 metre medley relay with a final relay time of 4:04.11.

References

External links
 

2000 births
Living people
Japanese female freestyle swimmers
Olympic swimmers of Japan
Swimmers at the 2016 Summer Olympics
Place of birth missing (living people)
Asian Games medalists in swimming
Asian Games bronze medalists for Japan
Swimmers at the 2018 Asian Games
Medalists at the 2018 Asian Games
Japanese female butterfly swimmers
Swimmers at the 2020 Summer Olympics
21st-century Japanese women